The Asia/Oceania Zone is one of the three zones of regional Davis Cup competition in 2014.

In the Asia/Oceania Zone there are four different groups in which teams compete against each other to advance to the next group.

Draw

 relegated to Group II in 2015.
 and  advance to World Group Play-off.

First round

China P.R. vs. New Zealand

India vs. Chinese Taipei

Second round

Uzbekistan vs. China

India vs. South Korea

First round relegation playoff

Chinese Taipei vs. South Korea

Second round relegation playoff

New Zealand vs. Chinese Taipei

References

Asia Oceania Zone I
Davis Cup Asia/Oceania Zone